Robert Claude Maze (May 25, 1918 – May 27, 1945) was an American military officer and aviator. He was killed in action during the Battle of Okinawa and was posthumously awarded the Distinguished Flying Cross.

Biography

Robert Claude Maze was born on May 25, 1918, in San Francisco, California. His parents were Albert Cressey Maze (1891–1943) and Miriam Jeannette Ham (1895–1997). Miriam married twice after her divorce from Albert Maze: first to Earl Winfield Spencer Jr., a pioneering United States Naval Aviator and the first husband of Wallis Simpson, and then to Arthur W. Radford, another U.S. Naval Aviator and the future Chairman of the Joint Chiefs of Staff.

In 1936, Maze enrolled at the University of California, Los Angeles. He was a member of the rowing team, participated in university diving competitions, and was a member of the Sigma Nu fraternity. He was also a member of Scabbard and Blade and the Pershing Rifles and a cadet in the Reserve Officers' Training Corps. He graduated in 1940 with a Bachelor of Arts degree in Economics. He lived in Oakland, California.

On June 19, 1940, he was promoted to the rank of second lieutenant in the U.S. Marine Corps. Among his comrades, he was known simply as "Bob". He later received the rank of major. In 1943, Robert Maze married Rosemarie Price at Naval Air Station Jacksonville in Florida. Originally from Honolulu, Hawaii, she graduated from Punahou School in 1941 and later attended Stanford University, where she became a member of the Delta Gamma sorority.

On January 10, 1944, Maze became commander of Marine Fighting Squadron 511 (VMF-511), based at Marine Corps Outlying Field Oak Grove, North Carolina and established on January 1 of that year. After training at Simmons-Nott Airport, North Carolina, Boca Chica, Florida, Naval Air Station Quonset Point, Rhode Island, and Naval Auxiliary Air Station Manteo, North Carolina, the squadron, equipped with F4U Corsair fighters, was transferred to Mojave, California, in September 1944. Assigned to the Pacific Ocean, the squadron departed for Pearl Harbor, Hawaii, on March 20, 1945, aboard USS Block Island (CVE-106). The ship was then sent to the shores of Japan, where in May and June 1945 the squadron made a number of sorties in support of military operations on Okinawa. At that time, the squadron consisted of eight F4U Corsairs and ten F6F Hellcats.

On May 27, 1945, Major Maze, together with a wingman, attacked several small Japanese ships off Ishigaki Island. Maze's plane was struck by anti-aircraft fire, while his wingman was able to break away. The burning plane crashed into shallow water in the East China Sea, killing Maze. He was 27 years old. Captain James L. Secrest assumed command of the squadron the same day and remained in that post until the end of the war. Neither Maze's body nor the wreckage of the plane was recovered. However, his name was inscribed on the Honolulu Memorial.

For his actions in the Pacific War, Maze was posthumously awarded the Distinguished Flying Cross, the Purple Heart and the World War II Victory Medal. Secrest was also awarded the Distinguished Flying Cross. The Distinguished Flying Cross was presented to Maze's widow, Rosemarie. They had a son, Robert Maze Jr., who was less than a year old at the time of his father's death.

Awards and decorations

Distinguished Flying Cross citation 

for service as set forth in the following CITATION:

References

1918 births
1945 deaths
American male divers
American male rowers
Aviators killed by being shot down
Aviators killed in aviation accidents or incidents in Japan
Burials at sea
Military personnel from California
Recipients of the Distinguished Flying Cross (United States)
Rowers from San Francisco
20th-century American economists
United States Marine Corps personnel killed in World War II
United States Marine Corps pilots of World War II
University of California, Los Angeles alumni
Victims of aviation accidents or incidents in 1945